Senganur  is a village in the Thiruvidaimarudur taluk of Thanjavur district in Tamil Nadu, India.

Demographics 

As per the 2001 census, Senganur had a population of 1,634 with 820 males and 814 females. The sex ratio was 993 and the literacy rate, 67.79.

References 

 

Villages in Thanjavur district